X-Faktor is a Hungarian television music competition to find new singing talent. The sixth series aired on RTL Klub in 2016. Bence Istenes presented his third series of X-Faktor. Gabi Tóth returned as a judge for the third time. Laci Gáspár, Peti Puskás and ByeAlex, joined her, who replaced judges Róbert Alföldi, Róbert Szikora and Gábor Szűcs (Little G. Weewil).

The series also saw the age limit decreased from 14 to 12.

Judges' houses
At this stage of the competition each judge mentored six acts. 24 acts went through for this stage of the show. Each judge had help from a guest judge to choose their final acts.

The twelve eliminated acts were:
Boys: József Berki, Kristóf Petics, Máté Türk
Girls: Cintia Laszló, Stephanie Semeniuc, Fanni Sorbán
Over 25s: Laszlo Brantner, Nikoletta Colette Horváth, Anita Anissza Sárosi 
Groups: Atomic Playboyz, Dynamite Dudes, The Wedding at the Slaughterhouse

Contestants

Key:
 – Winner
 – Runner-Up
 – Third place

Kristóf Petics had originally been chosen for the live shows, but was disqualified from the competition due to him performing fighting and problematic behavior. He was replaced by Ricsi Mata.

Results summary

{|
|-
| – mentored by Gabi Tóth (Girls)
|| – Bottom two/three
|-
| – mentored by Peti Puskás (Boys)
| – Safe
|-
| – mentored by ByeAlex (Groups)
|| – Eliminated by SMS vote
|-
| – mentored by Laci Gáspár (Over 25s)
|}

Live Shows

Week 1 (5 November)
 Theme: Songs that describe the contestants
 Celebrity performer: Spoon 21 & Dirty LED Light Crew ("Deák")
 Group performance: "Minden a miénk"

Judge's vote to eliminate
 Gáspár: Jaggers
 ByeAlex: Szandra Fejes
 Puskás: Jaggers
 Tóth: Jaggers

Week 2 (12 November)
 Theme: Love songs
 Celebrity performer: Margaret Island ("Sárga levelek")
 Group performance: "Sugar"

Judge's vote to eliminate
 Puskás: Liza Vince Aliz
 Tóth: Gergő Dánielfy
 Gáspár: Gergő Dánielfy
 ByeAlex: Gergő Dánielfy

Week 3 (19 November)
 Theme: When Calling the City
 Celebrity performer: The KOLIN ("Soda & Lime")
 Group performance: "Can't Stop the Feeling!"

Judge's vote to eliminate
 Gáspár: János Ónodi
 Puskás: János Ónodi
 Tóth: János Ónodi
 ByeAlex: not required to vote as there was already a majority, but stated that he would have eliminated Szandra Fejes

Week 4 (26 November)
 Celebrity performer: JETLAG ("Karszalagok")
 Group performance: "Up"

Judge's vote to eliminate
 Gáspár: Liza Vince Aliz
 Tóth: Szandra Fejes
 Puskás: Liza Vince Aliz
 ByeAlex: Szandra Fejes

With each act receiving two votes, the result was reverted to the earlier public vote. Liza Vince Aliz received the fewest votes and was eliminated.

Week 5 (3 December)
 Theme: One Hungarian song and one English song

Judge's vote to eliminate
 Gáspár: Dmitrij Gorbunov
 Puskás: Szandra Fejes
 ByeAlex: Szandra Fejes
 Tóth: Szandra Fejes

Week 6 (10 December)
 Theme: Contestant's choice and Mentor's choice

Judge's vote to eliminate
 ByeAlex: Dmitrij Gorbunov
 Puskás: Ham ko Ham
 Tóth: Ham ko Ham
 Gáspár: Dmitrij Gorbunov

With each act receiving two votes, the result was reverted to the earlier public vote. Ham ko Ham received the fewest votes and was eliminated.

Week 7 Final (17 December)
 Theme: mentor's choice, a duet with mentor, contestant's choice, winner's single

2016 Hungarian television seasons
Hungary 06